New Rockport Colony is a Hutterite community and census-designated place (CDP) in Teton County, Montana, United States. The colony sits on a bluff overlooking the Teton River to the southeast and Spring Coulee to the northeast.

The community was first listed as a CDP prior to the 2020 census.

Demographics

References 

Census-designated places in Teton County, Montana
Census-designated places in Montana
Hutterite communities in the United States